The House of Granier (or Grenier ) was a prominent noble family during the Crusades founded at the beginning of the 12th century by Eustachius Granarius, a Flemish nobleman from the Diocese of Thérouanne in the County of Saint-Pol who became lord of Sidon and Caesarea near 1110.

History

Sidon was captured in December 1110 and given to Eustace Grenier. The lordship was a coastal strip on the Mediterranean Sea between Tyre and Beirut. It was conquered by Saladin in 1187 and remained in Muslim hands until it was restored to Christian control by German Crusaders in the Crusade of 1197. Julian Grenier sold it to the Knights Templar after it was destroyed by the Mongols in 1260 after the Battle of Ain Jalut. One of the vassals of the lordship was the Lordship of the Shuf.

Caesarea was granted to Eustace Granier (or Grenier) in 1010. His descendants continued to rule Caesarea until it became the property of John Aleman by right of his marriage to Margaret Grenier in 1238 or 1243.

The Granier or Grenier family  became extinct  with two brothers: Balian II (who died at Botron in 1277)  and John (who died in Armenia in 1289), sons of Julian Grenier (died in 1275) lord of Sidon and his wife Euphemia, daughter of Hethum I, King of Armenia.

Lords of Sidon
 Eustace I Grenier (1110-1123)
 Gerard Grenier (1123-1171)
 Renaud Grenier (1171-1187, titular from then)
 Conquered by Saladin, 1187-1197
 Renaud Grenier (restored, 1197-1202)
 Balian I Grenier (1202-1239)
 Julian Grenier (1239-1260, titular from then)
 Sold to the Knights Templar (1260)

Lords of Caesarea
Eustace Grenier (1110–1123)
Walter I Grenier (1123–1154)
Hugh Grenier (1154–1169)
Guy Grenier (c. 1170s)
Walter II Grenier (c. 1180s–1189/91)
Juliana Grenier (1189/93–1213/6)
Aymar de Lairon (1189/93–1213/6)
Walter III (1213/6–1229)
John (1229–1238/41)
Margaret (1238/41–1255/77)
John Aleman (1238/43–1264/77)

Castles of the Lordship of Sidon and Lordship of Caesarea

Notes

References

Bibliography 
 Medieval Lands LORDS of CAESARIA (GARNIER)
 
 
 
 
 

 
Sidon
1110 establishments in Asia
Feudalism in the Kingdom of Jerusalem
Medieval Lebanon
1110s establishments in the Kingdom of Jerusalem
Disestablishments in the Kingdom of Jerusalem
Noble families of the Crusader states